Embroidery was an important art in the Islamic world from the beginning of Islam until the Industrial Revolution disrupted traditional ways of life.

Overview

Early Islam took over societies where the embroidery of clothes for both sexes and other textiles was very popular. Both the Byzantine and Persian Sasanian empires used clothing embroidered with designs including rather large human figures as well as animals, with effects comparable to those of modern teeshirts. The exterior of the Kaaba in Mecca was already before Islam "covered on the outside with multi-coloured textile hangings", very likely including embroidery as their modern Islamic equivalents often have. Muhammad objected to animal designs, perhaps embroidered, he saw on cushions when visiting his wife Aisha's house. These types of design largely disappeared under Islam, though plant-based motifs often remained acceptable. 

The 17th century Turkish traveller Evliya Çelebi called embroidery the "craft of the two hands". Because it was a sign of high social status in Muslim societies, it had long been widely popular. In cities such as Damascus, Cairo and Istanbul, embroidery was visible on handkerchiefs, uniforms, flags, calligraphy, shoes, robes, tunics, horse trappings, slippers, sheaths, pouches, covers, and even on leather belts. Craftsmen embroidered items with gold and silver thread. Embroidery cottage industries, some employing over 800 people, grew to supply these items.
 
In the 16th century, in the reign of the Mughal Emperor Akbar, his chronicler Abu al-Fazl ibn Mubarak wrote in the famous Ain-i-Akbari:

Embroidery offered symbolic protection for the most highly valued objects, including babies, household possessions and things with religious significance. When in the 16th and 17th centuries in Turkey, men wore turbans as a sign of Islam, they placed their turbans under embroidered cloths.

Techniques

A wide variety of embroidery techniques were used across the Islamic world, with an equally broad range of materials.

Uighur women embroider felt skull caps, for use on their own or as the base for a turban.

In Morocco and Tunisia, satin stitch was used for items such as decorative curtains and mirror covers. A form of satin stitch present in the Bedouin societies of the Arabian Peninsula, sometimes referred to as khiyat al madrassa ("school embroidery"), was used for furnishings. Prior to the stitching process, a shape was drawn onto the fabric by a skilled artist. Designs incorporating natural themes such as birds or flowers were most common.

Surface satin stitch, worked only on the upper surface, is a more economical but looser technique, vulnerable to wear, and so is mainly used for special occasions. In Punjab, Phulkari (flower work) shawls were however daily wear for women in the countryside, while special ones, bagh, were completely covered with embroidery and were made by maternal grandmothers for their granddaughters' weddings.

Chain stitch, which is adaptable and relatively easy to create, was used in Persia for Resht embroidery, with densely worked flowers and arabesques on felted woollen cloths. A type of embroidery similar to heavy chain stitch, known as kurar, was previously used by Bedouin to create dresses for both men and women. It required four people, with each person carrying four threads which were either of varying colors or silver and gold.

Cross stitch was used across the Middle East in Syria, Jordan, Palestine and Sinai to work wedding dresses with bold embroidery in red, with triangular amulets or carnation flowers on a black background.

Another widely used technique, Herringbone stitch, was used in Afghanistan to embroider bridegroom's smocks with raised bands of red, green or white stitchery on a white background.

Couching, the stitching of decorative cord on to the surface of a fabric, was used widely across the Islamic world. In Afghanistan, a velvet dress could be worked in military style with gold-coloured threads on the front, sleeves and hem. Chieftains in Montenegro could wear robes heavily couched in gold thread. In Palestine, dresses could be heavily worked in vertical panels with couched threads of metal and cotton. In Syria, jackets were couched with stylised flowers and trees. In the Northwest Frontier of Pakistan, waistcoats were sewn with a combination of appliqué panels and couched metal braid.

In Central Asia, Bokhara couching using continuous thread creates spectacular suzanis, hangings for wedding halls and bridal beds. Carnation and pomegranate motifs symbolised fertility. The technique was also used in Afghanistan and Uzbekistan for horse blankets and brazier covers.

Blanket stitch, buttonhole stitch, and eyelet stitch all had the original function of strengthening the edges of textiles subject to daily wear and tear, but were adapted for decorative purposes. In North Africa and the Middle East, eyelet stitch is made using a spoked wheel pattern of stitches, or in the Algerian form without an enclosing circle. In Turkmenistan, hook and tulip motifs could be worked in buttonhole stitch. In Afghanistan, men's shirts could be embroidered with herringbone and buttonhole stitches in white silk on white cotton, in elaborate arabesques.

Whitework, the use of white thread on a white ground, covers a variety of techniques and materials, and is used in different forms around the world. In Algeria, Kabyle women could wear whitework dresses. In Ghazni, Afghanistan, men's smocks could be embroidered with geometric whitework stitching embellished with small circular mirrors.

Needlepoint (canvaswork) was used for brightly coloured geometrical Hazara dress panels in Afghanistan.

Smocking was used for men's smocks in Nuristan in the Hindu Kush, the black stitching pulling the cloth into vertical bands with zigzag, crisscross and other simple geometric patterns.

Tambour work, a rapid form of embroidery using a fine ari hook instead of a needle, was one of the techniques used around Bokhara in Uzbekistan for suzanis.

Symbolism

Embroidered motifs often carry symbolic meaning. A widespread symbol across the Islamic world (and also often found on Islamic carpets) is the tree of life, signifying birth, growth to maturity, death and rebirth. It can be shown in many forms, such as a deliberately stylised tree, sometimes flanked by pairs of birds or fruits such as pomegranates, or a vase of flowers.

Textiles of sacred sites 

Embroidered textiles are features of the holy sanctuaries of Islam: the Great Mosque in Mecca and the Prophet's Mosque in Medina. They are regularly replaced, in traditions that go back centuries. Replacing the textiles is one of the privileges of the Custodian of the Two Holy Mosques, a title adopted by Mamluk, Ottoman, and Saudi Arabian rulers. The covering of the Kaaba, known as the kiswah, includes a sitara (a richly decorated curtain over the door) and hizam (a belt that wraps around the building). The earliest known sitara was made in 1544 in Egypt and the earliest Ottoman hizam was made for Selim II in the late 16th century. The basic designs of the sitara and hizam have changed little, although the embroidery in gold and silver wire have become more ornate over time. The Maqam Ibrahim (Station of Abraham) is a small square stone near the Kaaba which, according to Islamic tradition, bears the footprint of Abraham. It used to be housed in a structure with its own sitara that was replaced annually.

A dedicated workshop, the Dar al-Kiswa, was created in Cairo in 1817, which at its peak employed 100 craftsmen to make the kiswa and other textiles for Mecca and Medina. Since 1962 they have been produced at a workshop in Mecca. The colours used have changed in different eras. The present colour scheme for the sitara of the Kaaba, in use since the early 20th century, is gold and white embroidery on a black background. These inscriptions include verses from the Quran and supplications to Allah, as well as the names of the rulers who commissioned the textiles. The shahada (the Islamic declaration of faith) is another text used commonly.

Decline

Embroidery was important in traditional cultures across the Islamic world. The Industrial Revolution made colourful clothing available more quickly and more cheaply, displacing crafts such as embroidery.

For example, the masnat (enthronement) cloths of Hyderabad, India were made of velvet, hand-embroidered with glittering copper thread forming gold- and silver-coloured flowers (formerly actually of those metals). These were made for Mughal emperors and other rulers, and also for the bride and groom to sit on during weddings in Hyderabad. The technique derived from Turkey and Persia. A masnat takes between twelve days and two months to make, and can cost up to 100,000 rupees. Business declined during the 20th century, as fewer traditional cloths were ordered. Wedding providers offered a masnat as part of their service; machine-made cloths edged out handmade ones. As of 2012, only a few elderly masnat makers remained.

The embroidery researcher Sheila Paine concludes her book Embroidered Textiles by explaining that

Among the causes of embroidery's decline are politics and economics, but Paine suggests that the most powerful factor has been the education of young women. Embroidery is no longer the only way the young woman in Turkey or Baluchistan can secure her future by winning a husband; instead, she can aspire to a university degree and a career of her own. Paine argues that attempts to reinstate traditional embroidery, as with schools set up in Istanbul and Salamanca, will inevitably fail once the necessary social environment that gave handmade artefacts meaning has collapsed. In future, she states, embroidery will carry individual meaning, as in the West, and perhaps new social purposes, as with the politically significant embroidered dresses of the Palestinians.

Notes

References

Citations

Sources

Further reading
  (Percy Newberry collection)

External links
 Islamic embroidery at the Victoria and Albert Museum (44 objects)
 Stitches in time: Islamic embroidery exhibition in the Emirates Palace, 2010

Islamic art
Embroidery